Shadow of a Woman is a 1946 American drama film noir directed by Joseph Santley, featuring Helmut Dantine and Andrea King.  The film is based on the novel He Fell Down Dead written by Virginia Perdue.

Plot
A woman (Andrea King) on the verge of a breakdown marries a fraudulent medical doctor (Helmut Dantine) she hardly knows, putting her in the path of fear and danger.  She suspects her husband is starving his young son from a previous marriage.

Cast
 Helmut Dantine as Dr. Eric Ryder
 Andrea King as Brooke Gifford Ryder
 William Prince as David G. MacKellar, Louise's Lawyer
 John Alvin as Carl. Emma's son
 Becky Brown as Genevieve Calvin
 Richard Erdman as Joe, Counterman at Owl Lunch
 Peggy Knudsen as Louise Ryder, Eric's Ex
 Don McGuire as Johnnie, MacKellar's Photographer
 Lisa Golm as Emma, Eric's Sister
 Larry Geiger as Philip Ryder, Eric's Son
 Monte Blue as Mike, Police Lieutenant
 J. Scott Smart as Timothy Freeman
 Leah Baird as Mrs. Calvin, Genevieve's Mother
 Lottie Williams as Sarah the Calvin Maid
 Paul Stanton as Dr. Nelson Norris

Reception
Film critic Dennis Schwartz panned the film, writing, "A failure in every possible way. Joseph Santley flatly directs this film noir adapted from Virginia Perdue's novel He Fell Down Dead. The script by writers C. Graham Baker and Whitman Chambers was lacking credibility. The acting was hammy and unconvincing. The film offered hardly any entertainment value and the irrelevant story was more of a turn off than anything else. On top of all that, there were serious gaffes in the plotline that filled the story with holes the size of craters. This postwar B-film melodrama reunites Hotel Berlin co-stars Helmut Dantine and Andrea King. Shadow of a Woman might be remembered by film buffs only because it played in an early restaurant scene "How Little We Know", the Hoagy Carmichael song that Lauren Bacall sang in To Have and Have Not."

TV Guide wrote about the screenplay, writing, "A slightly unrealistic story line hinders this drama that deals with a bride's terror."

Box office
According to Warner Bros figures the film earned $490,000 domestically and $242,000 foreign.

References

External links
 
 
 
 
 Shadow of a Woman at the Official Andrea King web site

1946 films
1940s thriller films
American black-and-white films
1940s English-language films
Film noir
Films scored by Adolph Deutsch
Warner Bros. films
American thriller films
Films directed by Joseph Santley
1940s American films